Naga Bazaar Ward is a ward located under Nagaland's capital city, Kohima. The ward falls under the designated Ward No. 4 of the Kohima Municipal Council and is sub-divided into Upper Naga Bazaar and Lower Naga Bazaar.

Education
Educational Institutions in Naga Bazaar Ward:

Schools 
 Naga Bazaar Baptist School
 Naga Bazaar Government Middle School
 Naga Bazaar Government Primary School

See also
 Municipal Wards of Kohima

References

External links
 Map of Kohima Ward No. 4

Kohima
Wards of Kohima